Paolo Veneziano, also Veneziano Paolo or Paolo da Venezia (active by 1333, died after 1358) was a 14th-century painter from Venice, the "founder of the Venetian School" of painting, probably active between about 1321 and 1362. He has been called 'the most important Venetian painter of the 14th century'.  His many signed and dated works, some in collaboration with his sons, range between 1333 and 1358. He was regarded as the official painter of the Venetian Republic.

He led the development in Venice of the elaborately-framed polyptych or "composite altarpiece" form, which became popular all over Italy during the 13th century, partly in response to liturgical changes (only reversed in the 20th century) which placed the priest celebrating mass on the same side of the altar as the congregation, so with his back to them for much of the time.  This encouraged the creation of altarpieces behind and above the altar, as a visual devotional focus.  He is the oldest Venetian painter whose name is known, and the earliest to paint the new subject of the Coronation of the Virgin.

His style is "still Byzantine", that is to say Italo-Byzantine, but increasingly influenced by the Gothic art developing north of the Alps, and personal elements.  However, influence from Giotto is "almost entirely absent".

Life
He was born to a family of artists.  He operated a large workshop in which he worked together with his sons Marco, Luca, and Giovanni. He was the official painter of Andrea Dandolo, for whom he and his sons Luca and Giovanni painted the Pala Feriale or “weekday altarpiece”, for the famous metalwork and enamel Pala d'Oro of the St Mark's Basilica in Venice, which was only opened on Sundays and feast days.  Unfortunately most of the many scenes of these painted covers, probably his most prestigious commission, are now lost.

Paolo was in the past identified with the artist responsible for the works attributed to the Master of the Washington Coronation.  There is no longer unanimity among art historians regarding this identification.

Style
Paolo's style was indebted to Byzantine influences but also betrays a knowledge of contemporary painting in Rimini.  His more advanced works show the influence of Gothic art.  Through his art he was the founder of the Venetian school which would exert its influence throughout the 14th century and in particular on Lorenzo Veneziano, apparently not a relation, but possibly a pupil.

Notes

References
 Steer, John, Venetian painting: A concise history, 1970, London: Thames and Hudson (World of Art), 
"Venice: Mundus Alter" in "Virgin and Child", Italian Renaissance Learning Resources, Oxford Art Online In collaboration with the National Gallery of Art, online

External links 
Paolo Veneziano at the National Gallery of Art
Paolo Veneziano: Art & Devotion in 14th-Century Venice, July 13–October 3, 2021, Getty Center
"There has never been a U.S. show devoted to Venice’s first great painter, Paolo Veneziano. Until now." Review by Sebastian Smee of Getty Center exhibition.
"‘Paolo Veneziano: Art & Devotion in 14th-Century Venice’ Review: Worshiping at the Altar of Beauty" Review by Peter Plagens of Getty Center exhibition.

14th-century Italian painters
Italian male painters
Painters from Venice
Year of birth uncertain
14th-century deaths